Ghermăneşti may refer to several villages in Romania:

 Ghermăneşti, a village in Snagov Commune, Ilfov County
 Ghermăneşti, a village in Banca Commune, Vaslui County
 Ghermăneşti, a village in Drânceni Commune, Vaslui County

and a village in Moldova:
 Ghermăneşti, a village in Suhuluceni Commune, Teleneşti district